The SEC Derby is the set of matches between the Kentucky Wildcats (UK) and South Carolina Gamecocks men's soccer programs, respectively representing the University of Kentucky and University of South Carolina. Since the 2022 season, it has been a conference matchup in the Sun Belt Conference (SBC). Both programs had been single-sport members of Conference USA (C-USA) from 2005 through the 2021 season. Both teams are the only colleges in the Southeastern Conference (SEC) which sponsor men's soccer, which the conference does not sponsor as an indirect consequence of Title IX restrictions.  South Carolina had started its program in 1978 while an independent, and UK started its program in 1991. From 1991 to 2004, UK had been a Mid-American Conference (MAC) member for men's soccer only. Despite having joined the Metro Conference in 1983, South Carolina continued to play men's soccer as an independent, not joining for that sport until 1993, two years after the rest of its athletic program had joined the SEC. The Gamecocks also played in the Metro in that league's final men's soccer season of 1994. The following year, C-USA was created with the merger of the Metro with the Great Midwest Conference, a league that had been formed in 1991 by a group of schools that included three charter Metro members. South Carolina was not invited to remain as a men's soccer member after the merger.

The matches between the two teams have also been nicknamed The Southeastern Conference Men's Soccer Championship.

Prior to the establishment of the formal derby in 2005, Kentucky had a rivalry with Vanderbilt, when the Vanderbilt Commodores men's soccer program was active. When the UK–Vanderbilt rivalry was first played in 1991, Vanderbilt was a men's soccer independent, later becoming a single-sport member of the Sun Belt Conference for the 1995 and 1996 seasons and the Missouri Valley Conference from 1997 until the school dropped men's soccer after the 2005 season. The last UK–Vanderbilt match was played in 2000. South Carolina did not regularly schedule Vanderbilt at the time, as they had primarily been independent (except for the final two years of the Metro's existence); in 2005, South Carolina's return to the reunified C-USA led to UK joining that league.

Both Carolina and UK won two C-USA tournament titles before moving to the SBC.

Results

Kentucky vs. South Carolina 

† = CUSA Tournament game 
‡ = SBC Tournament game 
↑ = NCAA Tournament game† 
¶ = 0-0 game in knockout tournament decided on penalties.  The official score is Kentucky 0 (0), South Carolina 0 (3).

Kentucky vs. Vanderbilt

South Carolina vs. Vanderbilt

List of champions

Championships by school 

† on hiatus

See also 
 Southeastern Conference

References

External links 
 Kentucky Men's Soccer
 South Carolina Men's Soccer

Sun Belt Conference men's soccer
Southeastern Conference soccer
College soccer rivalries in the United States
Kentucky Wildcats men's soccer
South Carolina Gamecocks men's soccer
Vanderbilt Commodores men's soccer
1991 establishments in Kentucky
1991 establishments in South Carolina
1991 establishments in Tennessee
2000 disestablishments in Tennessee